The Fair Cheat is a 1923 American silent comedy film directed by Burton L. King and starring Edmund Breese, Wilfred Lytell, and Dorothy Mackaill.

Cast

Preservation
With no prints of The Fair Cheat located in any film archives, it is a lost film.

References

Bibliography
 Munden, Kenneth White. The American Film Institute Catalog of Motion Pictures Produced in the United States, Part 1. University of California Press, 1997.

External links

Lobby card at Getty Images

1923 films
1923 comedy films
Silent American comedy films
Films directed by Burton L. King
American silent feature films
1920s English-language films
Film Booking Offices of America films
1920s American films